Vincenzo "Enzo" Avitabile (born 1 March 1955) is an Italian saxophonist, composer and singer-songwriter. He plays a fusion of world music and jazz fusion music, rooted in Neapolitan traditions and characteristic dialect.

Born in Naples, Italy, Avitabile started playing saxophone as an autodidact as ten years old. He graduated in flaute at the Naples Conservatory. He started his career as a turnist, and made his record debut in 1982 with Avitabile, an album which saw the collaboration of Richie Havens.

He tours with his band, going under the name of Enzo Avitabile & Bottari. Bottari is a traditional rhythm from southern Italy. It involves percussion elements such as wine barrels, wooden drums and the like. Avitabile keeps the Bottari culture in mind while experimenting with fusion Jazz (sax, trumpets, etc.).

He has collaborated with Pino Daniele, Edoardo Bennato, James Brown, Afrika Bambaataa and Tina Turner, Trilok Gurtu, Daby Touré, Ashraf Sharif Khan Poonchwalaamong . With his Bottari lineup, he was nominated for the prestigious 'Audience Award' in the 2005 BBC Awards for World Music.

In 2012 he was the subject of Jonathan Demme's docu-movie Enzo Avitabile Music Life.

In the same year, he recorded "Black tarantella", an award-winning record with new songs that included duets and collaborations with outstanding international musicians from Europe, America and Africa like, among others, David Crosby, Bob Geldof and Franco Battiato.

In 2017 he won 2 Donatello's David Awards for best song and best soundtrack of the movie "Gli indivisibili".

Discography 

Avitabile (1982)
Meglio Soul (1983)
Correre in fretta (1984)
SOS Brothers (1986)
Alta tensione (1988)
Stella dissidente (1990)
Enzo Avitabile (1991)
Easy (1994)
Addò (1996)
O-Issa (1999)
Salvamm'o munno (2004)
Sacro Sud (2006)
Festa, Farina e Forca (2007)
Napoletana (2009)
Black tarantella (2012)
Lotto Infinito (2016)
Pelle Differente (2018)

References

External links 

 
 Enzo Avitabile at Allmusic

1955 births
Living people
Musicians from Naples
Male saxophonists
Italian male singer-songwriters
Italian jazz saxophonists
21st-century saxophonists
21st-century Italian male singers
Male jazz musicians